Looc or LOOC may refer to:

Looc
Looc is the name of places in the Philippines:

 Looc, Occidental Mindoro, a municipality
 Looc, Romblon, a municipality
 Looc, a barangay in Calamba
 Looc, a barangay in Mandaue City

LOOC
LOOC may refer to:

 Lillehammer Olympic Organizing Committee, the organizing committee for the 1994 Winter Olympics
Law & Order: Organized Crime (L&O:OC, LO:OC), a U.S. police procedural TV show

See also

 L2OC, a navigation signal for GLONASS
 
 
 LOC (disambiguation)